The Strategic Response Group (SRG) is a rapid reaction force of the New York City Police Department (NYPD) tasked with immediate intervention duties during periods of civil unrest, terrorist incidents, or other citywide emergencies. It was established in 2015.

History
Prior to 2015, situations in New York City that required the rapid response of police forces in a certain section of the city would be handled through a system of mobilization and redistribution of specially designated patrol units from the city's precincts. In 2014, New York City Police Commissioner William Bratton determined this was an inefficient system and that a special force of dedicated police officers would offer certain advantages, including the ability to operate and train as a cohesive unit. The NYPD announced plans to create the Strategic Response Group in January 2015, and the unit became active in May of that year.

Initial plans called for 350 officers in the SRG, but by the end of 2015 the number of officers had increased to 800. Funding has been provided both by city appropriation and grants from the U.S. Department of Homeland Security.

Operations
The Strategic Response Group is designed to provide a large, rapidly deployable force of police for situations such as civil unrest, large-scale terrorist attacks, and special high-profile events such as the Macy's Thanksgiving Day Parade or meetings of the United Nations General Assembly. When not otherwise responding to one of these critical incidents, the SRG is used to conduct emphasis patrols in neighborhoods which have experienced recent spikes in crime.

The SRG is housed within the NYPD's Special Operations Bureau, which also includes the Emergency Service Unit, Harbor Patrol, Mounted Patrol and NYPD Aviation. 

The Strategic Response Group operates 119 Ford Police Interceptor Utility SUVs. Its officers are equipped with ballistic helmets, M4 carbines, SR16 CQB and riot shields in addition to standard police equipment.

See also
Comparable units in other countries:
 Mobile Gendarmerie, France.
 Police Support Unit & Territorial Support Group,  UK. 
 Units for the Reinstatement of Order, Greece.
 Police Tactical Unit, Hong Kong (China).
 (Intervention Group), Montreal (Canada)

References

New York City Police Department
Organizations established in 2015
Law enforcement in the New York metropolitan area